Edward Francis Finden (1791–1857) was a British engraver.

Life
Finden was the younger brother, fellow-pupil, and coadjutor of William Finden, and shared his successes and fortunes.

Works

Finden executed some separate works, among early ones being a set of etchings for Richard Duppa's Miscellaneous Opinions and Observations on the Continent (1825) and Illustrations of the Vaudois in a Series of Views (1831). He was also a large contributor of illustrations to the annuals, books of beauty, poetry, and other sentimental works then in vogue.

The separate engravings he executed included: The Harvest Waggon, after Thomas Gainsborough; As Happy as a King''' after William Collins; Captain Macheath in Prison, after Gilbert Stuart Newton; The Little Gleaner after Sir William Beechey; The Princess Victoria, after Richard Westall  and Othello telling his Exploits to Brabantio and Desdemona, after Douglas Cowper. He also did engravings for landscape painter James Duffield Harding (1798–1863) including "Mount Edgcumbe".

He died at St. John's Wood, aged 65, on 9 February 1857.

References

Attribution

External links
 Engraving of the painting  by Richard Westall with a poetical illustration by Letitia Elizabeth Landon in Forget Me Not annual for 1827.
 Engraving of the painting  by Robert Hills with a poetical illustration by Letitia Elizabeth Landon in Forget Me Not annual for 1827.
 Engraving of a painting by James Stephanoff,  for the Forget Me Not annual for 1828, with illustrative verse by Letitia Elizabeth Landon
 An engraving of a painting by William Etty,  with the poem The Angel's Call, by Felicia Hemans, for The Amulet annual for 1829.
 An engraving by of the painting by William Boxall,  with illustrative verse by Letitia Elizabeth Landon in The Literary Souvenir annual for 1831.
The Arab Maid) by Letitia Elizabeth Landon
 An Engraving in Fisher's Drawing Room Scrap Book, 1834, of an illustration for Letitia Elizabeth Landon's poem :
 Mosque of Mustapha Khan, Beejapore'' painted by William Purser.
 Engravings for Fisher's Drawing Room Scrap Books of pictures with  poetical illustrations by Letitia Elizabeth Landon:
1837,  by Samuel Prout.
1838,  by Charles Bentley.

 

1791 births
1857 deaths
English engravers